Dark Friday is a 1993 Italian thriller film directed by Aldo Lado.

The film was shot in just eight weeks in 1991 but, due to the bankruptcy of the distribution company, it hit the big screen only two years later and, in 1994, in the United States.

Plot
Ann and Mary are spending a Friday night with friends at an amusement park when a fight suddenly breaks out. The girls run away and meet two rich young men with a sophisticated woman, who invite them to go with them to a lonely villa by the sea. But their intention is to subject them to a sadistic game: the girls are terrified at the sight of a knife, and they don't know that Ann's boyfriend is desperately looking for them. To defend her friend, Mary loses control and hits one of the two boys, who appears to be dead. The other young man assaults Mary while Ann assists without being able to do anything. The night will end in tragedy.

Cast
Silvia Cohen
Paolo Calissano: Gino
Zoe Scott: Ann
Mary Dicorato: Mary
Robert Egon: Luca

References

1993 films
1993 thriller films
Italian thriller films
1990s Italian-language films
Films directed by Aldo Lado